HOPE International is a Christian faith-based nonprofit organization based in Lancaster, Pennsylvania. HOPE International now operates in 16 underserved countries and has assisted over 2.5 million people with small loans and savings services since it began operations in 1997.

History 
After the collapse of the Soviet Union in 1991, Jeff Rutt and the Pennsylvania-based church he attended partnered with a church in Ukraine. After failing to effectively help the Ukrainian community through handouts, and upon looking into different forms of development aid, Rutt decided to initiate a microfinance program to empower Ukrainians. The program was successful, and in 1997 Rutt established HOPE International.

After further work in Ukraine, the organization began looking for opportunities to expand its operations into other countries where a need for such services had been identified. In 2004, Peter Greer became HOPE's president after spending several years at various microfinance organizations and attending graduate school at Harvard University.

Homes for HOPE 
Homes for HOPE, an affiliate program of HOPE International, was established in 1998 by Jeff Rutt. Through Homes for HOPE, home builders and trade partners are able to build benefit homes on a pro bono basis. To date, the organization has raised more than $10,000,000 in support of HOPE International, and has completed projects in 23 states in the United States, as well as in Alberta, Canada. In 2008, Jeff Rutt was awarded the Hearthstone Builder Humanitarian Award for his humanitarian efforts.

Approach to poverty alleviation 
The organization operates through one of two models depending on the country of operation.

The first method is the savings group program. Savings groups are formed by a group of 10 to 50 individuals who meet regularly to make savings deposits into a common fund. Clients regularly save money to stabilize household income, provide a safety net in emergencies, start or expand businesses, or pay for household expenses such as school fees. Many groups also allow for savers to take out loans as well as accumulate savings.

HOPE’s second model is microfinance institutions. This approach involves a group of 10-50 entrepreneurs who together receive loans from HOPE International or its local partner. Each loan recipient cross-guarantees the loans of other groups members since there is no form of collateral to offer for the loan. Accountability to the group provides a powerful incentive to make regular loan repayments.

In certain HOPE-network countries, entrepreneurs can also qualify for individual loans, typically for higher loan amounts than those in the group model. Clients may graduate from receiving group loans once they have proven credit-worthiness, or they may qualify from the start due to their financial situation, business success, or credit history.

Tracking outcomes 
HOPE desires to see families impacted across four domains: material, personal, social, and spiritual. In 2014, they formed a Listening, Monitoring, and Evaluation (LM&E) team to better understand the impact of their services. For example, in a survey conducted in Malawi in 2019, where HOPE has worked since 2013, they learned that 81% of savings group members surveyed reported being able to meet a significant financial emergency need within one month, compared to 37% of the broader Malawian population as reported by the World Bank in The Global FINDEX Database 2017.

Financial accountability 
HOPE International’s work is funded through individual donors, churches, foundations, businesses, and Homes for HOPE. From 2016-2021, approximately 97% of loans in the HOPE network were repaid. HOPE-network loan recipients repay loans with interest and investments remain in their local microfinance institution, stimulating the local economy and allowing for continued loan distribution.

Charity Navigator has awarded HOPE International its highest four-star rating for fifteen consecutive years (2006-2021), and as of August 2022 HOPE earned a score of 100/100 in accountability and transparency and an overall rating of 92.56.

HOPE International also has a philanthropic dividend policy. As HOPE-led microfinance institutions become sustainable, they are committed to giving away 10% of their profits to support local Christ-centered children’s ministries.

Countries where HOPE International operates / Partner organizations 

 Burundi: Turame partnership established in 2008 and transitioned to HOPE-managed in 2016; savings program launched in 2012
 Dominican Republic: Esperanza International partnership established in 2005
 Haiti: Program established in 2009
 Malawi: Program established in 2013
 Moldova: Invest-Credit partnership established in 2005
 Paraguay: Diaconía partnership established in 2018
 Peru: Comas Christian & Missionary Alliance Church partnership established in 2011
 Philippines: Center for Community Transformation (CCT) partnership established in 2007
 Republic of Congo: Program established in 2010
 Romania: ROMCOM partnership established in 2007
 Rwanda:  Urwego Bank partnership established in 2005 and transitioned to HOPE-managed in 2016; HOPE Rwanda savings program established in 2007
 Ukraine: Program established in 1997
 Uganda: Seed Effect partnership established in 2021
 South Asia: Partnerships established in 2007, 2011, and 2014 (country name withheld for security reasons)
 Zambia: Program established in 2015
 Zimbabwe: Partnership established in 2011; transitioned to HOPE-managed in 2017

Governance 
HOPE International has a 14-member board of trustees chaired by Jeff Rutt. Peter Greer was appointed as president of the organization in 2004 after working abroad with various microfinance organizations and graduating from Harvard Kennedy School. Greer heads HOPE International’s 15-member executive team. Program directors also oversee the organization’s work from within its countries of operation.

References 

Microfinance organizations
Development charities based in the United States
Religious charities based in the United States
Christian charities based in the United States
Christian organizations established in the 20th century
Charities based in Pennsylvania
International charities